Mueang Yasothon is the capital district of Yasothon province in northeastern Thailand on the Chi River. Sub-district Nai Mueang ('in the town') defines the city limits of the town of Yasothon.

History
According to the chronicles of Mueang Yasothon, in 1795 Phra Chao Worawongsa (Phra Wo), Minister of Vientiane, and several others set off to live with the king of Champassak. Along the way they came to a jungle where spirits dwelt, and seeing that it was a good place, they built a village there next to the grounds of an abandoned wat. They called it Wat Singh Tha, which remains to this day. The village they called Ban Singh Tha. Singh is a mythical lion; tha means 'pose'.  A marker for a chedi erected by Wat Singh Tha says that, during the Thonburi Period, grandson Kham Su called the settlement Ban Singh Thong. The wat, which had been deserted with dense jungle blocking the way to the river landing, was re-built and renamed after the new village. The change from thong ('gold') to tha was influenced by two factors: tha means 'port' or 'landing' and also means 'pose' with many connotations. Thus the change in name to Singh Tha means 'port lion' and also 'imposing lion' such as those posed on the Lion Gate, and on pedestals on the temple grounds.

In 1814, King Rama II renamed Ban Singh Tha to Yasothon and raised its status to mueang.

Yasothon was the national winner of the World Wildlife Fund's 2018 "One Planet City Challenge". The municipality was lauded for its efforts to curb greenhouse gas emissions, by means of recycling efforts and transport initiatives.

Geography
Neighboring districts are (from the north clockwise) Sai Mun, Kut Chum, Pa Tio and Kham Khuean Kaeo of Yasothon Province; Phanom Phrai and Selaphum of Roi Et province.

Administration
The district is divided into 18 sub-districts (tambons), which are further subdivided into 190 villages (muban). The town (thesaban mueang) Yasothon covers the entire tambon Nai Mueang. There are a further 17 tambon administrative organizations (TAO).

Education
Private schools in Mueang Yasothon:
 Santitham Wittayakom Primary School — Baháʼí Faith

The secondary schools in Mueang Yasothon are:
 Yasothon Phitthayakhom School
 Yasothon Phitthayasan School

College in Mueang Yasothon
 Yasothon Technical College วิทยาลัยเทคนิคยโสธร

Military
Camp Bodindecha is west of the city proper in Ban Doet Tambon Doet, on Route 23 (Chaeng Sanit Road ). The camp has been home to the Royal Thai Army 16th Infantry Regiment since 23 December 1985.

References

External links
 Official government page of Mueang Yasothon

Mueang Yasothon